Orber Aquiles Moreno Sulbarán (born April 27, 1977) is a Venezuelan former professional baseball relief pitcher. He played for the Kansas City Royals and New York Mets of Major League Baseball (MLB) who in parts of three seasons spanning 1999–2004. Listed at 6' 3" (1.90 m), 225 lb. (102 k), Moreno batted and threw right-handed.

Moreno threw a sharp slider, a changeup and a cutter, but had a good command of his low-90s fastball. He made his majors debut in the 1999 season, ranking as one of the top Royals prospects, but he injured his arm in an off-field accident and aggravated it by pitching.

Moreno had surgery performed and rehabbed at Triple-A in 2002, but then he showed up out of shape from the long layoff and was released. Soon after that, he signed with the Mets, pitching for them from 2003 to 2004.

In between, Moreno pitched 12 years in the Minor Leagues, including stints with the Diablos Rojos del México, Dorados de Chihuahua and Tigres de Quintana Roo of the Mexican League, and for the Leones del Caracas club of the Venezuelan Winter League during 12 seasons from 1996–2013.

See also
 List of Major League Baseball players from Venezuela

References

External links
, or Retrosheet
The Baseball Gauge
Minor League Baseball
Mexican League
Venezuela Winter League

1977 births
Living people
Binghamton Mets players
Diablos Rojos del México players
Dorados de Chihuahua players
Gulf Coast Mets players
Gulf Coast Royals players
Kansas City Royals players
Lansing Lugnuts players
Leones del Caracas players
Major League Baseball pitchers
Major League Baseball players from Venezuela
Memphis Redbirds players
Mexican League baseball pitchers
New York Mets players
Norfolk Tides players
Omaha Golden Spikes players
Baseball players from Caracas
St. Lucie Mets players
Tigres de Quintana Roo players
Tijuana Cimarrones players
Venezuelan expatriate baseball players in Mexico
Venezuelan expatriate baseball players in the United States
Wichita Wranglers players
Wilmington Blue Rocks players
World Baseball Classic players of Venezuela
2009 World Baseball Classic players